Public Image: First Issue is the debut studio album by English rock band Public Image Ltd, released in 1978 by record label Virgin.

It is considered one of the pioneering records in the development of post-punk.

Recording

"Public Image"
"Public Image", the debut single, was recorded first. Recording started on a Monday in mid-July 1978 (most probably 10 or 17 July) at Advision Studios with engineer John Leckie and assistant engineer Kenneth Vaughan Thomas. For mixing and overdubs, the band then went into Wessex Studios with engineer Bill Price and assistant engineer Jeremy Green. 
John Leckie (engineer, 2003): "I [...] came down Monday morning from The Manor after a few hours sleep to Advision Studios, a studio I hadn't worked in before [...] I engineered the session [...] Keith Levene took the multi-track tape home that night and came in the next day having forgotten it and accused me of stealing it! The track was pretty much a live take with Levene's guitar double-tracked. John Lydon did his vocal through a Space Echo, dub-style. I did a rough mix and went home. The next day the band never showed up and my rough mix was the record. I got no credit but Richard Branson did give me £250! It wasn't stressful, just a lot of fun!"
Bill Price (engineer, 2008): "They'd recorded it and he wasn't quite happy, so he came to me to mix and do overdubs. Johnny was nominally in charge but he would look over his shoulder and ask Jah 'Is this the right direction?'"

On Saturday, 22 July 1978, the music press reported that the band had been in the recording studio; the following week, Virgin Records announced that PiL's debut single would be released on 8 September 1978.

"Theme", "Religion", "Annalisa"
The entire first side of the record was recorded in the autumn of 1978 at Townhouse Studios and The Manor Studio with engineer Mick Glossop.

"Low Life", "Attack", "Fodderstompf"
The last three songs on the second side were recorded at Gooseberry Sound Studios, a cheap reggae studio used because the band had run out of money, with engineer Mark Lusardi and assistant engineer Jon Caffery. Lydon knew the studio from the recording of Sex Pistols demos in January 1977.

By late September 1978, the recording of the album was finished. The band had briefly considered including an alternative version of "Public Image" with different lyrics on the album, a plan that was finally rejected.

In November or December 1978, Wobble and Levene returned to Gooseberry Sound Studios to record a 12-inch EP, Steel Leg V. the Electric Dread, with guest vocalists Vince Bracken and Don Letts.

Final mix of the album
For the final mix of the album tracks, the band returned to Townhouse Studios with Glossop, who remembers: "I do remember working on those other three [Gooseberry Studio] tracks, but I can't remember exactly what I did – probably mixing."

Content 
"Theme": 
John Lydon (1978): "Didn't you ever have that feeling when you get up with a hangover, and you look at the world and think 'Count me out, I'd rather die!'?"
Keith Levene (2001): "'Theme' came together because Wobble had this bassline and there was Jim playing and me doing that, and I fucking got it off on the first go. By the time we recorded it, which was probably the third time we played it, that was where it was at. It went down well in gigs and we loved the tune. John made the lyrics up as he went along or he had them stashed secretly [...] He came up with a lot of stuff just perfectly, like what he did with 'Theme'. He did it the first time and it was perfect."

"Religion I": 
Keith Levene (2001): "Putting 'Religion' on the album with just vocals, I just did that as a producer. I thought that this had to be done so I said 'Run it off, John' and I just recorded it. That was a cool idea."

"Religion II": 
Sid Vicious (1978): On new songs: "Yeah, we've got one about God, and it's a real attack. It is a real attack. And it's played to the Death March."
John Lydon (1978/89/92/94): "A putdown of what they have made religion into. I started writing that song in the States." "When I showed Sid, Paul and Steve the lyrics to 'Religion' on the bus, their only response was 'Whoa!' [...] We had a very long wait at the San Antonio gig when we got there very early. I wanted them to listen to what I was doing, but they wouldn't have it under any circumstances. I knew it was over with Steve and Paul from that point onward". "There's one picture from America where we're all sitting on the stage, and Sid's got the bass and I'm pointing, and Steve's sitting behind. That was 'Religion', and they wouldn't touch it: 'It's vile, can't do that, people won't like us', haha!" "Malcolm said 'Ooh no, that's bad for the image, can't do things like that!'"
Joe Stevens (Sex Pistols tour photographer, 2011): "They needed to write some new songs and deliver them to the record label. They had a crack at writing 'Sod in Heaven' but it wasn't happening."
Paul Cook (1988): (When asked: "Did you rehearse 'Religion'?") "No. there was an idea, John wanted to write a song about that but never got round to it."
Keith Levene (2001): "With 'Religion', we made up this tune and told him to sing the lyrics over it [...] He had the words but he didn't know how the tune was going to go."
Jah Wobble (2012): "I think Lydon had the words for 'Religion' already, I ended up not liking the song [...] I don't like the sensibility behind 'Religion', I don't like religion getting knocked per se. [...] I wasn't mad on the mix either, it tries a bit too hard. It's just my taste, so I think it's rather turgid that song, it's my least favourite. Keith likes it though."

"Annalisa": 
John Lydon (1978): "[It's] about these silly fucking parents of this girl who believed she was possessed by the devil, so they starved her to death."
Jim Walker (2007): "At The Manor we wanted a live drum sound, and so we had to use the old billiard room. It was set up so it was just me and Rotten eye to eye, as I drummed and he sang."

"Public Image": 
John Lydon (1978): "'Public Image', despite what most of the press seemed to misinterpret it to be, is not about the fans at all, it's a slagging of the group I used to be in. It's what I went through from my own group. They never bothered to listen to what I was fucking singing, they don't even know the words to my songs. They never bothered to listen, it was like 'Here's a tune, write some words to it.' So I did. They never questioned it. I found that offensive, it meant I was literally wasting my time, cos if you ain't working with people that are on the same level then you ain't doing anything. The rest of the band and Malcolm never bothered to find out if I could sing, they just took me as an image. It was as basic as that, they really were as dull as that. After a year of it they were going 'Why don't you have your hair this colour this year?' And I was going 'Oh God, a brick wall, I'm fighting a brick wall!' They don't understand even now."
Jah Wobble (2009/12): "Indeed the first bassline that I ever presented to John and Keith [...] It had been the first song that we had worked on in the rehearsals." "It's the open E string with an interval to the B which I always really like, that was first ever proper b-line I wrote. I made that up at home and took it into the studio and we finished it off there. There was another bass line at the beginning which I'm not sure if it got used, it might have kind of got turned into 'Religion'."

"Low Life": 
John Lydon (1978/99): "Malcolm McLaren the bourgeoisie anarchist – that about sums him up!" "'Low Life' is about Sid and how he turned into the worst kind of rock 'n' roll star."
Keith Levene (2001/07): "There was this guy that was an old mate of John's (...) This guy, [fashion designer] Kenny MacDonald, made his suit and all of ours, and it made him look good to have the guys from PiL wearing his stuff (...) He wouldn't be his lapdog, and John thought he was a star and wanted that. John named him on our first album on 'Low Life'." "That song was about Malcolm McLaren in theory, but at one point I think it was about [Lydon's schoolfriend] John Gray. Lydon's usually got the hump with someone, and he usually writes with someone in mind, someone he's not too happy with."
Jah Wobble (2009): "It's kind of rock, but with a weird feel."

"Fodderstompf": 
John Lydon (1978): "You should've seen Branson's face when he heard that, he was furious!"
Jim Walker (2001): "Not even a song just a wank, ripping off our fans. It still turns my stomach thinking about it."
Tony Dale (roadie, 2004): "It's mostly Wobble on the track, as you probably realise, with his Northern falsetto, wise-cracks, and fire-extinguisher antics. [...] I remember Wobble coming in[to the control room] for the cigarettes. It's the engineer [Mark Lusardi] who's 'Suspicious', not me, I am accused of not realising that 'Love makes the world go around'."
Jah Wobble (2005/09): "In its own way, it's as mental as Funkadelic. And it had the perfect funk bassline." "Keith didn't make it down for the initial recording of that track, so it was just me, John and Jim."

Related tracks
"The Cowboy Song" (single B-side): 
John Lydon (1978): "You can dance to that song, and it cost us approximately £1 to make. It's just a jolly good disco record and it came about cos we were bored and couldn't think of a B-side."
Jim Walker (2001/07): "The thing was, I'd come up with the idea for that song one morning. I was trying to rip off the theme song for Bonanza." "We all sat around the mic drunk, did two takes, screaming randomly."

"You Stupid Person" (unreleased instrumental demo): 
Jah Wobble (1999/2007): "It was an instrumental from when we very first started, when Jim Walker was on drums. That was really good." "That was a good one, a really strong song."
Jim Walker (2001): "Once during a break I stayed on my kit, you know, fooling around, when suddenly Keith jumped up and shouted to me to repeat whatever it was that I'd been playing. It was just some hi-hat thing. I'd always focused on developing my left hand side, in other words my hi-hat side. Anyway, I repeated it. Wobble instinctively came up with the perfect bassline part. Then Keith, who had heard exactly what he wanted through the thing I'd started, played the most blistering guitar part I think I ever heard him play. That was how PiL wrote: through the subconscious. That song ended up being named 'You Stupid Person'. It was meant to be our second single. [...] It was actually a lot better than 'Public Image'. It would have been impossible to keep from being a number one hit, and probably would have broke us in America all by itself. We managed to demo it, I've still got a copy."
John Lydon (2004): "I don't know what he's talking about [...] I don't know what he's quite on about."

"Steel Leg V. the Electric Dread":
Jah Wobble (1988/2009): "I also released 'Steel Leg V. the Electric Dread', another 12-inch with Keith Levene on guitars and Vince, a mate from Hackney, on vocals. He thought he was going to be a millionaire but it was only like a session fee. I gave him a ton (£100) which weren't bad money in the late '70s". "Keith played drums on that. The extra money came in really handy. To be honest it was a pisstake record in the same way that 'Fodderstompf' was a pisstake track, you only have to listen to Vince's side to realise that."
Don Letts (guest vocalist, 2007): "Keith Levene and Jah Wobble needed some money, so they ended up making a single for Virgin Records called 'Steel Leg V. The Electric Dread'. They got me down to the studio to work on some vocals, even though I had never sung in my life. I remember sitting on the stairs with a microphone trying to write some words. Eventually I said to them 'Okay guys, I'll go home and work out some lyrics.' I never heard back from them, and the next thing I knew there was a record out. They had used my demo vocals and stuck them on the track! [...] It was a crap record, and I look back and laugh about all this stuff now." "I didn't even know they were recording me. I went into some basement toilet just to mumble some lyrics into a mic and hear what they sound like [...] Then I'm waiting to get a call to do the record, and the next thing I heard is they've played with my voice a bit, stuck a track under it and put the whole thing out as a finished record. I was a little bit pissed off to tell you the truth, because I thought we'd finish it properly."

"Public Image" promo video
In August 1978, a promotional video for the upcoming single "Public Image" was shot by Peter Clifton's production company Notting Hill Studio Limited, which had just completed The Punk Rock Movie. 
Peter Clifton (video producer, 2006): "They formed Public Image and hired me and Don Letts to shoot their first video clip for Virgin. I hired a theatre in Fulham and dressed the band up on stage with garbage bags as a backdrop, and Richard Branson, the owner of Virgin, came down to witness the filming. There was a quiet lull in the middle of one of the takes, and Sid Vicious screamed at the top of his voice 'Peter Clifton, where's the 200 quid you owe me?'"
Don Letts (video director, 2007): "Before the PiL promo, I was Don Letts, DJ at the Roxy, dread with a camera. All of a sudden I had a film crew and a 16 mm camera. The promo was shot at a studio in Olympia and I was making the shit up as I went along, having never been to film school. The video suited PiL's mood, being totally anti-celebrity, it showed them playing in a dimly-lit studio. Because it was John's band, I naively decided people just wanted to see him – due to my total inexperience I went for the safe option. It is just John's dynamics that give the video any substance whatsoever. It was a very intense and dark performance [...] I have made near enough 400 promo videos in my time. My first was for PiL. They chose me as they did not want to use boring old farts, and we had a good relationship."
John Lydon (1978): "The promotional film was made and paid for by ourselves out of our advance. Virgin weren't interested."

The promo video was released on 15 September 1978 and shown on British TV twice in October 1978. In December 1986, it was released on VHS, and on DVD in October 2005.

Cancelled American release
On 9 February 1979, Warner Bros. Recording Studios in North Hollywood manufactured a test pressing of the album for PiL's American label, Warner Bros. Records. The album's sound was considered too non-commercial for an American release, and PiL were asked to re-record parts of it. Although the band recorded new versions of some tracks between March and May 1979, the album was never released in the USA. However, in 1980 Warner Bros. released the song "Public Image" on the compilation album Troublemakers, the only album track released in the USA until the 2013 release of the entire album.

The re-recorded version of "Fodderstompf" was released under the title "Megga Mix" as the B-side of the "Death Disco" 12" single (29 June 1979). The track was later included on the PiL compilations Plastic Box (1999) and Metal Box: Super Deluxe Edition (2016); to date, it is the only track from the February 1979 First Issue re-recording sessions to be officially released.

On 18 June 2013, the album was finally officially released in the USA via Light in the Attic Records.

Reception 

In 1979, NME reported that a court in Malta had halted sales of the album because the lyrics of "Religion" offended public morals and decency.

Upon its release, Public Image: First Issue received a 2- (out of 5) star review in Sounds. Reviewer Pete Silverton said that the single is the "Only wholly worthwhile track on the album." He dubbed the rest of the songs as "morbid directionless sounds with Rotten's poetry running just behind it." Nick Kent of NME was similarly negative, quipping that "unfortunately the 'image', public or otherwise, is a good deal less limited than many of the more practical factors involved in this venture."

However, the album is now considered a groundbreaking post-punk classic. AllMusic critic Uncle Dave Lewis stated that the record "helped set the pace" for the post-punk genre, adding that it was "among a select few 1978 albums that had something lasting to say about the future of rock music." Pitchforks Stuart Berman wrote, "First Issue's industrial-strength stompers anticipate the scabrous art-punk of the Jesus Lizard and Slint, while Levene's guitar curlicues on 'Public Image' are the stuff Daydream Nations are made of." Public Image: First Issue is, along with Metal Box, included in the book 1001 Albums You Must Hear Before You Die.

Track listing

Personnel 
Public Image Limited
 John Lydon – vocals, piano
 Keith Levene – guitar, synthesiser
 Jah Wobble – bass, vocals and fire extinguisher on "Fodderstompf"
 Jim Walker – drums

Charts

References 

Public Image Ltd albums
1978 debut albums
Virgin Records albums